Paris, France today has more than 421 municipal parks and gardens, covering more than three thousand hectares and containing more than 250,000 trees. The following is a partial list of public parks and gardens in the city.

Woodlands

 Bois de Boulogne 
 Bois de Vincennes

Parks

 Parc André Citroën  
 Parc de Bagatelle 
 Parc de Belleville 
 Parc de Bercy 
 Parc Georges-Brassens 
 Parc de la Butte-du-Chapeau-Rouge 
 Parc des Buttes Chaumont 
 Parc du Champ de Mars 
 Parc de Choisy
 Parc floral de Paris 
 Parc Kellermann 
 Parc Monceau 
 Parc Montsouris 
 Parc de la Villette

Gardens

 Jardin d'Acclimatation 
 Jardin du Bassin de l'Arsenal 
 Jardin Atlantique  
 Jardin Pré Catelan
 Jardin Catherine-Labouré
Jardin des Champs-Élysées
 Jardin des Halles 
 Luxembourg Garden (Jardin du Luxembourg)
 Jardin naturel
 Palais Royal Garden (Jardin du Palais Royal) 
 Jardin des Plantes 
 Jardin du Ranelagh 
 Jardin des Serres d'Auteuil 
 Jardin Shakespeare
 Jardin Tino-Rossi 
 Jardins du Trocadéro  
 Tuileries Garden (Jardin des Tuileries)
 Jardin Villemin

Promenades

Gardens of Avenue Foch
Promenade plantée  
 Île aux Cygnes
Promenade des Berges de la Seine 
Cours-la-Reine

Notes and citations

Landscape architecture
Paris
Paris
Parks